Cheryl Ball (born 1973) is an academic and scholar in rhetoric, composition, and publishing studies, and Director of the Digital Publishing Collaborative at Wayne State University. In the areas of scholarly and digital publishing, Ball is the executive director for the Council of Editors of Learned Journals and the Editor-in-Chief for the Library Publishing Curriculum. Ball also serves as co-editor of Kairos: A Journal of Rhetoric, Technology, and Pedagogy, an open access, online journal dedicated to multimodal academic publishing, which she has edited since 2006. Ball's awards include Best Article on Pedagogy or Curriculum in Technical or Science Communication from the Conference on College Composition and Communication (CCCC), the Computers and Composition Charles Moran Award for Distinguished Service to the Field, and the Technology Innovator Award presented by  the CCCC Committee on Computers in Composition and Communication (7Cs). Her book, The New Work of Composing (co-edited with Debra Journet and Ryan Trauman) was the winner of the 2012 Computers and Composition Distinguished Book Award. Her contributions to academic research span the areas of digital publishing, new media scholarship, and multimodal writing pedagogy.

Biography

Education 
Cheryl Ball earned a B.A. from Old Dominion University in 1996, an M.F.A. in Poetry from Virginia Commonwealth University in 2000, and a Ph.D. in Rhetoric and Technical Communication, from Michigan Technological University in 2004.

Teaching and professional experience 
Ball is currently the director of the Digital Publishing Collaborative at Wayne State University libraries. Previous to this, she was an associate professor of Digital Publishing at West Virginia University, and in 2013–14, was a visiting Fulbright Scholar at the Oslo School of Architecture and Design, in Oslo, Norway. From 2007 to 2014, Ball was an assistant and associate professor at Illinois State University.

Professional contributions

Research and development

Ball's research has focused on the areas of teaching and learning in multimodal composition, digital and open access publishing, new media studies, and alternative assessment models for multimodal writing. In the area of digital publishing, Ball is the recipient, with Andrew Morrison, of over one million in grant funding from the Andrew W. Mellon Foundation for the development of open access digital publishing platform, Vega as well as an NEH Digital Humanities Start-Up Grant. Ball's developmental work on Vega emerges from her recognition of the need for more robust digital platforms for the editing and publishing of multimedia research. She describes Vega as "an editorial management system that will move a piece of scholarly multimedia through the submission, review, and production processes as a single, scholarly entity." Her research on the teaching, reading, and assessment of multimodal or new media composition forwards a rhetorical approach for analyzing and producing multimodal texts.

Editorial work 
As an editor, Ball has extensive experience in open access, digital, and academic publishing, especially in the areas of new media or multimedia scholarly publishing. Much of this work has been focused on the open access multimedia publication Kairos: A Journal of Rhetoric, Technology, and Pedagogy, which she has taken an active editorial role in since 2006. While her official title has changed over the years (from managing editor, to editor, to co-editor), Ball's work for the journal has substantially shaped its mission as "the longest-running, and most stable, online journal" in the field of rhetoric and composition. Ball was also instrumental in clarifying how articles or "webtexts" published in Kairos provide an opportunity for scholars to explore how multimodal, digital design elements can "enact authors' scholarly arguments, so that the form and content of the work are inseparable." Beyond her work with Kairos, Ball has also served as both an assistant and associate editor of Computers and Composition: An International Journal from 200 to 2004, and is currently the #writing book series editor at WAC Clearinghouse.

Selected works

Books 
 Ball, C. E., & Loewe, D. M. (2017). Bad ideas about writing. West Virginia University Libraries; Digital Publishing Institute. https://www.oercommons.org/courses/bad-ideas-about-writing
Journet, D., Ball, C., & Trauman, R. (Eds.). (2012). The New Work of Composing. Logan, UT: Computers and Composition Digital Press/Utah State University Press. http://ccdigitalpress.org/nwc
Ball, Cheryl, & James Kalmbach (eds.). (2010). RAW: (Reading and Writing) New Media. Hampton Press.

Textbooks 
 Ball, C. E., Sheppard, J., & Arola, K. L. (2022). Writer/designer: A guide to making multimodal projects. Bedford/St. Martin's. 
 Ball, C. E., Arola, K. L., & Bedford/St. Martin's (Firm). (2006). IX visual exercises for tech comm. Boston: Bedford/St. Martins.

Articles 
 Eyman, D., & Ball, C. (2015). Digital humanities scholarship and electronic publication. Rhetoric and the digital humanities, 65.Ball, C. E. (2004). Show, not tell: The value of new media scholarship. Computers and Composition, 21(4), 403–425.
 Eyman, D., & Ball, C. E. (2014). Composing for digital publication: Rhetoric, design, code. Composition studies, 42(1), 114–117.
 Ball, C. E., Bowen, T. S., & Fenn, T. B. (2013). Genre and transfer in a multimodal composition class. Multimodal literacies and emerging genres, 15–36.
 Ball, C. E. (2012). Assessing scholarly multimedia: A rhetorical genre studies approach. Technical Communication Quarterly, 21(1), 61–77.
 Anderson, D., Atkins, A., Ball, C., Millar, K. H., Selfe, C., & Selfe, R. (2006). Integrating multimodality into composition curricula: Survey methodology and results from a CCCC research grant. Composition Studies, 34(2), 59–84.
 Ball, C. E. (2006). Designerly≠ readerly: Re-assessing multimodal and new media rubrics for use in writing studies. Convergence, 12(4), 393–412.

National awards
Charles Moran Award for Distinguished Service to the Field. (2018). Presented by Computers &Composition: An International Journal  at the 2018 Computers & Writing Conference.
Computers and Composition Distinguished Book Award. (2013). For The New Work of Composing (ed.Journet, Ball, & Trauman).
CCCC Technical and Scientific Communication Award for Best Article on Pedagogy or Curriculum inTechnical or Scientific Communication. (2013). For “Assessing Scholarly Multimedia: A Rhetorical Genre Studies Approach.” [See publications entry].
Technology Innovator Award. (2012). Presented by the Conference on College Composition andCommunication Committee on Computers in Composition and Communication (7Cs).

See also
Multimodality
Digital publishing
Computers and writing
Conference on College Composition and Communication
Composition Studies

References

Further reading

Published interviews 
Mahon, Wade. (2011). Multimodal composition & the rhetoric of teaching: A conversation with Cheryl Ball. Issues in Writing 18(2).
Ball, C. (2010). Writers Talk Featuring Cheryl Ball. Http://Streaming.Osu.Edu/Knowledgebank/Cstw10/Cheryl_Ball.Mp3.

Review 

 Vie, S. (2011). RAW (Reading and Writing) New Media (Eds. Cheryl Ball and James Kalmbach). Composition Studies, 39(2), 164–167.

External links
 Conference on College Composition and Communication
 Writing Studies Tree Entry on Ball
 KairosCamp: A Digital Publishing Institute for Authors and Editors

Living people
1973 births
American academics
Rhetoric theorists